Leonard Chester Taylor Jr. (born May 2, 1966) is a retired American professional basketball power forward who spent one season in the National Basketball Association (NBA) with the Golden State Warriors during the 1989–90 season. Born in Los Angeles, California, he attended the University of California, where he was a first-team All-Pac-10 selection, and signed with the Warriors as a non-drafted free agent.

External links

1966 births
Living people
Basketball players from Los Angeles
California Golden Bears men's basketball players
Golden State Warriors players
Power forwards (basketball)
San Jose Jammers players
Undrafted National Basketball Association players
American men's basketball players